The Frank Sinatra Christmas Collection is a 2004 Christmas compilation album from Frank Sinatra. The selection of tracks on the album spans Sinatra's career from 1957 to 1991 and includes four previously unavailable tracks—two previously unissued on CD and two previously unissued in any format—the latter the last Christmas carol Sinatra recorded.

Description 
The album was released by Warner Music Group on October 26, 2004. It features 18 Christmas-themed tracks recorded by Sinatra from 1957 to 1991, including all the holiday tracks recorded by Sinatra during his years with the Reprise label. Two tracks previously unissued on CD were featured on the album. They were renditions of "The Christmas Song" and "White Christmas", both duets recorded with Bing Crosby and the Nelson Riddle Orchestra from the 1957 ABC television special Happy Holidays with Bing and Frank, which aired only once, on December 20 of that year.

Sinatras last recorded Christmas carol 
A fourth previously unissued track included on the album was an acoustic recording of "Silent Night" recorded by Sinatra in 1991 with his son Frank Sinatra, Jr. at the piano, for a children's charity benefit. It was Sinatras last recorded Christmas carol. The then-75-year-old Sinatra had not made any recordings for three years, and the track was not released at the time. For the original 2004 album release, the backing for the vocal was rearranged by former Sinatra collaborator Johnny Mandel using a group of former Sinatra backing musicians including pianist Bill Miller, guitarists Al Viola and Ron Anthony, bassists Chuck Berghofer and Jim Hughart and percussionist Larry Bunker, conducted by Sinatra Jr. Of the recording, Sinatra Jr. said "The whole crew was there ... So except for the absence of Frank Sinatra, it was a typical Sinatra recording date. We all expected he'd come walking in at any moment." According to Sinatra Jr., it took two years for producer Charles Pignone to persuade Warner Bros. to finance the recording: "This is not the kind of music that people at record companies have interest in ... They will spend millions, millions, to develop some inconsequential rock or rap group, but when Charles approached with a budget of some $30,000 to make a brand new Frank Sinatra song, there was great reluctance."

Sinatras daughter Nancy said of the track: "It was an emotional day, because he was doing it for the children. It is so sweet and tender that it is just heart-wrenching."

Critical reception 

Mark Sabbatini of allaboutjazz.com described the album as uneven, with good early "swinging" tracks giving way to less interesting later recordings "drowning in strings and cheesy arrangements". He considers the two 1957 duets with Crosby a highlight. The three mid-album tracks from the 1960s, featuring vocals by Sinatra and his family, Sabbatini refers to as "tiresome ... novelty-item treatment". He described the final "Silent Night" recording by the then-75-year-old Sinatra as "... off in both pitch and cadence, and ... a terribly sad reminder of how frail he was at the end of his career." Overall, he describes the album as "a good match for two groups: those without a Sinatra holiday album wanting a sampler rather than something from a specific era and completists seeking the new songs."

Edna Gunderson of USA Today describes the final track as "a little blue" compared to the rest, which have "a merrier lilt".

Track listing

Certifications

Personnel
 Vocals: Frank Sinatra, Nancy Sinatra, Frank Sinatra, Jr., Tina Sinatra, Bing Crosby, Fred Waring and his Pennsylvanians, The Jimmy Joyce Singers
 Arrangers: Nelson Riddle, Don Costa, Dick Reynolds, Harry Betts, Jack Holloran

References 

Christmas compilation albums
2004 Christmas albums
Christmas albums by American artists
Pop Christmas albums
Reprise Records compilation albums
Frank Sinatra compilation albums
2004 compilation albums